Stuart Ryder (born 6 November 1973) is an English former professional footballer who played for Walsall, Mansfield Town and Nuneaton Borough.

Stuart was considered to have excellent potential, being selected for England U21s in the Toulon tournament but suffered a serious knee injury and was eventually forced to retire early

Honours
with Walsall
Football League Fourth Division runner-up: 1994–95

References

1973 births
Living people
Sportspeople from Sutton Coldfield
English footballers
England under-21 international footballers
Association football defenders
Walsall F.C. players
Mansfield Town F.C. players
Nuneaton Borough F.C. players
English Football League players